This is a list of best-selling Japanese role-playing game (JRPG) franchises. For inclusion on the list, a franchise must have sold or shipped at least one million copies. For the purpose of this article, a JRPG is defined as a franchise which: (1) is considered a role-playing game by reliable sources and was made in Japan or (2) made in another country, but otherwise the franchise would be difficult to differentiate from a JRPG due to having common traits found in JRPGs such as: anime/manga character designs, RPG elements, fantasy setting and widely considered as being inspired or influenced by a JRPG. The numbers for sales or shipments are based on the most recent available sourced numbers and often may not include non-video game sales or more recent sales; actual total sales numbers may be higher.

List
 – This color indicates a sub-series of a larger video game franchise. This does not necessarily apply for franchises that are not video game-based.

See also
List of best-selling video game franchises
List of best-selling visual novels
List of highest-grossing media franchises

Notes

References

Japanese role-playing games
Japanese role-playing game
best-selling Japanese role-playing game franchises
Japanese role-playing game franchises
Video games developed in Japan